Claire Anderson is a British pharmacist who is a professor at the University of Nottingham. She investigates pharmacy practice research, and developed the first diploma in community pharmacy.

Early life and education 
Anderson studied pharmacy at Cardiff University and graduated with a bachelor's degree in 1982. She then worked as a clinical pharmacist in hospital and a community pharmacist in Oxford. In 1989, she was appointed postgraduate tutor for the Oxford regional health authority and to the pharmacy faculty at King's College London. Whilst at King's, she worked toward a doctorate, where she investigated the role of community pharmacists in promoting health. In particular the Barnet High Street health scheme. Anderson developed a postgraduate masters and diploma in community pharmacy at King's.

Research and career 
Anderson was appointed to the faculty at the University of Nottingham in 1999. She was promoted to a personal chair in social pharmacy in 2003. She is a leading social pharmacy researcher her work focuses on designing and evaluating pharmacy practice and health service models and exploring patient's experiences of using medicines. Her research seeks to improve patient and public health in the light of contemporary health care reforms. More recent interests are global health professional education and human resources for health. She has extensive research leadership experience within pharmacy and across a number of health, education and social science disciplines. She seeks to combine in depth qualitative and ethnographic methodologies with the practical demands of producing timely and formative research outcomes that can inform and change practice and policy.

In 2019, Anderson was elected Chair of the English Pharmacy Board. She is a member of the International Pharmaceutical Federation Board of Pharmacy Practice. In 2021, Anderson was elected President of the Royal Pharmaceutical Society.

Selected publications

References 

Living people
Year of birth missing (living people)
Alumni of Cardiff University
Alumni of King's College London
British pharmacists
British women academics